The Alpina B5 and D5 are a series of high performance executive cars manufactured by German automobile manufacturer Alpina, which is based on the BMW 5 Series of the car manufacturer BMW.

First generation (E60; 2005-2011)

The E60 is the first generation of B5, which was produced from 2005 to 2011.

Second generation (F10; 2011-2016) 

The F10 is the second generation of B5, which was produced from 2011 to 2016. Alpina produced two variants of the F10/F11 5 Series, the petrol-engined B5 and diesel-engined D5.

Third generation (G30; 2017-present) 

The third generation of the B5 is based on the BMW 5 Series (G30) presented in October 2016. It was presented at the Geneva Motor Show in March 2017 and was launched in September 2017 at prices starting at €112,000.

References 

B5
Cars introduced in 2005
Rear-wheel-drive vehicles
Euro NCAP executive cars
Wagons
Sedans
Executive cars
2010s cars
2020s cars